The Head Of The Fish Regatta is a rowing race held on the last weekend of October each year on Fish Creek, within Saratoga County, New York State. The race is named the "Head" of the Fish because it is a head race.

The event is hosted by the Saratoga Rowing Association. The race is organized by volunteers.
Tom Frost founded the regatta in 1986. 
The original vision for the regatta was one "that wouldn't take itself too seriously." Protests were forbidden and "timing errors were considered part of the regatta's charm." Winners are awarded lacquered fish heads.

Notes

Saratoga County, New York
1986 establishments in New York (state)
Rowing competitions in the United States
Head races
Sports in Capital District (New York)